Joanna of Aragon (Barcelona 7 November 1344-Castellón, Ampurias 1385) was the second child of Peter IV of Aragon and his first wife Maria of Navarre. She was an Infanta of Aragon by birth and Countess of Ampurias by her marriage. She was a member of the House of Barcelona.

Marriage 
On the 19 June 1373, Joanna married John I, Count of Ampurias. This was his second marriage after the death of his first wife Blanche of Sicily. Joanna was 29 at the time of the marriage, she was considered an older bride.

Many members of her family showed dislike to her father's fourth wife Queen Sibila, due to her low ranking birth and her family's interference at court. Joanna's husband John came into conflict with Sibila, and then rebelled against Joanna's father. The marriage of Peter and Sibila also led to a strain between himself and his three surviving children: Joanna, John and Martin.

Joanna and John were married for twelve years, in this time they had two sons:
John (1375–1401), succeeded his father as Count of Ampurias
Peter (d.1402), succeeded his brother, however only reigned for a year.

Joanna died aged forty or forty-one in 1385. Her husband died thirteen years later in 1398. She is buried at Poblet Monastery.

Ancestors

References 

1344 births
1385 deaths
House of Aragon
Spanish countesses
14th-century Spanish women
14th-century people from the Kingdom of Aragon
Daughters of kings